The Kao Gong ji (考工记), translated variously as the Record of Trades, Records of Examination of Craftsman, Book of Diverse Crafts or Artificers' Record, is a classic work on science and technology in Ancient China, compiled sometime between the fifth and third centuries BCE and later included in the Zhou Li.

The study of Kao Gong Ji, Kao Gong Ji Jie, was published ca 1235 by Lin Xiyi 林希逸. It was followed by Dai Zhen (Kaogongji tu, 1746) and Cheng Yaotian 程瑶田 (Kaogongji chuangwu xiaoji, ca 1805).

It has been suggested that "The Kaogong ji may have been written by an administrator to assure the emperor that everything was under control. It is part of a manual for how to run the empire".

The Kao Gong Ji is the oldest known technical encyclopedia. The book includes recipes for metal-making described as "enigmatic".
In 2022 researchers identified jin and xi, key components for making bronze for 100 years thought to have been copper and tin, as possibly pre-made alloys of composition not yet determined. This can yield bronzes more like early Chinese bronzes, revealing unexpected complexity in early Chinese metal production.

English translations

References

External links 
  Illustrations and intro on www.cultural-china.com

Chinese classic texts
Science and technology in China
Zhou dynasty texts
5th-century BC books
Qi (state)